Phulkahakatti  is a village development committee in Siraha District in the Sagarmatha Zone of south-eastern Nepal.But now it is in Dhangadhimai municipality . At the time of the 1991 Nepal census it had a population of 6813 people living in 1237 individual households.

References

External links
UN map of the municipalities of  Siraha District

Populated places in Siraha District